Lyubov Ilyinichna Yaskevich (born 17 April 1985) is a Russian female sport shooter. At the 2012 Summer Olympics, she competed in the Women's 10 metre air pistol, finishing fourth, 0.6 of a point behind bronze medalist Olena Kostevych. She was born in Kemerovo, Russia (then Soviet Union).

References

1985 births
Living people
People from Kemerovo
Sportspeople from Kemerovo Oblast
Russian female sport shooters
Olympic shooters of Russia
Shooters at the 2012 Summer Olympics
Universiade medalists in shooting
Universiade gold medalists for Russia
Medalists at the 2013 Summer Universiade
21st-century Russian women